Oleg Viktorovich Kiselyov (born 11 January 1967 in Yaroslavl) is a Russian handball player.

He won a gold medal with the Unified Team at the 1992 Summer Olympics in Barcelona. He played for the Russia men's national handball team at the 1996 Summer Olympics in Atlanta, where Russia finished 5th.

References

1967 births
Living people
Russian male handball players
Russian expatriate sportspeople in Spain
Olympic handball players of Russia
Handball players at the 1992 Summer Olympics
Handball players at the 1996 Summer Olympics
Olympic gold medalists for the Unified Team
Olympic medalists in handball
Sportspeople from Yaroslavl
Medalists at the 1992 Summer Olympics
BM Granollers players